Josh Grace (born: 22 November 1972) is a sailor from Sydney, Australia. who represented his country at the 2000 Summer Olympics in Sydney, Australia as crew member in the Soling. With helmsman Neville Wittey and fellow crew member David Edwards they took the 8th place.

References

Living people
1972 births
Sailors at the 2000 Summer Olympics – Soling
Olympic sailors of Australia
Sailors from Sydney
Australian male sailors (sport)
Sportsmen from New South Wales